Leslie Blackett Wilson (born 1930) was chair of Computing Science at the University of Stirling, appointed on August, 1979. Previously, he was a Senior Lecturer in Computer Science at the Computing Laboratory of the  University of Newcastle upon Tyne. He joined the Computing Laboratory in 1964. Before that, since 1951, he was a Senior Scientific Officer at the Naval Construction Research Establishment at Dunfermline.

He has written four books in computer science and combinatorics. His book Comparative Programming Languages was regarded among the major textbooks on programming languages  and has received positive reviews since its first edition. This book was translated into French in its second edition. As a researcher, he is best known for his contributions to extensions of the stable marriage problem.

He was the doctoral advisor of Jayme Luiz Szwarcfiter.

Education 

Leslie Blackett Wilson got a B.Sc. in Mathematics from Durham University in 1951 and a D.Sc. degree from the University of Newcastle upon Tyne in 1980.

Books 

 . Translated into French.

References 

1930 births
Alumni of Durham University
Alumni of Newcastle University
Computer scientists
Living people